Cristobal Pazmino is an Ecuadorian guitarist and composer.

Early life and education
Pazmino was born in Riobamba, Ecuador, in 1958. He started learning the guitar at a very early age with musicians from his own neighbourhood with whom he was to play for over 3 years - electric guitar, bass guitar, ‘night guitar’ (known elsewhere as the classical guitar) all without sight reading. It was not until 1976 when he arrived in Paris that  he decided to study the classical guitar in earnest, first at the Schola Cantorum in Paris for 3 years, then at the Conservatoire National de Musique de St Maur de Fossés, Val de Marne (CNRM) for 5 years where he was awarded the Gold medal (Médaille d’Or) in 1986.

Career

Cristóbal Pazmiño is an Ecuadorian musician has had his music aired in France and further a field and he is recognized as one of the top guitarists in his country. He started his journey to fame as a child in Riobamba where his brother taught him to play the guitar by ear. Both brothers were recognized for their talent with the guitar and they often performed in their school and as part of a musical group in the area. When Pazmiño grew up, he went to France to study at the National Conservatory of Saint-Maur-DES-Fosses. Here he not only gained a diploma but also obtained a gold medal for his skill with a guitar. During his time in France, his guitar was one of the only ways for him to reconnect with his homeland. His music was first aired in 1976 in France and it has since been heard across the globe. He has performed in 32 countries and plays mainly Ecuadorian and Latin American music and has gathered quite a following of fansjoy his performances.
Cristobal Pazmino is the inspiration, founder, and artistic director of the International Festival of Guitar in Vendôme, which has become one of the highlights of the guitar music calendar in France.

Having become a classical guitarist, he devoted himself solely to Latin-American music, and Ecuadorian music in particular, combining popular music with the techniques of classical guitar. He set out on an international career which led him to 32 different countries, where he was  frequently billed with the biggest names of Latin American guitarists. In France his recordings have been featured in various TV and film productions : for the TV channel F3, the short film “The Golden Earth of the Incas” in  1989, for the documentary film “Panama, Prince of Hats”  for the Arte Channel in 1997, the cable channels in 2002 for their documentaries on Chile, and in Ecuador Teleamazonas, TV channel of the capital Quito, broadcast his theme tune for a whole season for the series “At home with the family”.

VENDÔME brand ambassador.
Corporate member of SACEM France.

Credits
I Festival International de guitare d' Alsace France [1992]
IV Festival International, Stockholm Suède [1992]
VI Festival International, Fribourg Suisse [1992]
III Festival Internacionalional San José - Costa Rica [1993]
Guitarras del Mundo 95 : Rio Cuarto et Buenos Aires, Argentine [1995]
Palais del IILA à Rome Italie 1996
Latin-Américan Guitar Masters-Universite Internationale de Florida, Miami USA [1997]
Bolivar Hall Festival, Londres Angleterre [1998].
V festival Guitarras del Mundo [1999],
I y V Festival Internacional de guitarra - Vendôme Francia [1997 ]y [2001]
II Festival International de Cagliari en Italia [2001]
VII Festival Guitarras del Mundo [2001 ] [2003]
Festival de Santisteban del Puerto - Jaen España [2004]
Festival Regino Saenz de la Maza, Burgos España [2005]
Festival de la ciudad de MONTS Francia [2005]
Guitarras del Mundo-Argentine [2006] en duo avec Floriane Charles.
15° Festival de la ville d'ANTONY (92) France, 1° abril [2007]
11° Festival International de Vendôme France, 8 abril [2007]
Festillesime41 junio [2007], 3 concerts en Loir et Cher
10° festival de guitarra de Taxco Mexique, julio [2007]
10° semana internacional de la guitarra en Burgos España, agosto [2007]

Edited scores
2015 : « Sol de Madrugada »  14 œuvres originales, paru chez Editions VAN DE VELDE Paris.  (Catalogue Henri Lemoine, Paris)
2002 : « Riobambeñita »  Compositions et arrangements pour guitare, paru chez EML Bruxelles.
1999 : « 5 Pieza ecuatorianas »  paru chez EML Bruxelles

Film
Je tenais à vous dire 

Réalisé par Pierre Mobèche,  Valoris'Action. Vendôme [2021]

Sur cette scène du son et de l’image, au cœur du Vendômois des années vingt et vingt-et-un de l’an 2000, la narration est brève et se joue en 20 minutes, initialement entre deux hommes, puis tant d’autres...
Cristobal PAZMINO livre en toute confiance les sonorités latino-américaines de ses compositions, de sa guitare à la caméra du réalisateur Pierre MOBECHE, qui s’en empare dans l’agilité et la puissance d’une danse, pour nous transmettre sans le moindre doute le message d’une complicité partagée.
L’alchimie chorégraphique du scénario nous transporte....

Le message initial ?
Celui d’une sincère gratitude à l’égard du présent, qui nous offre l’opportunité de faire le choix de créer l’alliance, en dépit de tout, entre nos arts et nos œuvres, ici celles d’un musicien et d’un réalisateur, alliance sans laquelle ne saurait naître la flamme de l’émotion esthétique.
Celui aussi d’une gratitude affichée et plus que jamais nécessaire, envers tous ceux dont le souffle contribue à vivifier ce feu afin de nous hisser tant librement que tous ensemble sur la scène de la vie, pour y clamer notre joie et partager le bonheur de nos choix.

Soundtracks
[1999] « En Familia » Téléamazonas Quito - Équateur
[1997] « Panama Prince des chapeaux » film documentaire, (la5) ARTE
[1989] « La Terre et l’or des Incas » France3

Discography
Bestiario andino 2017
Ternura 2010
Guitarra de Alas 2007
Quito de mis Ensueños 2005
Riobambeñita 2000
Guitarras del Mundo 1995
5 siècles de guitare (Festival d'Alsace) Vol1. et Vol2. 1992
Pasillo Inmortal 1991
Melodias de America del Sur 1988

References

External links 
Dernières Nouvelles d'Alsace

Living people
Ecuadorian composers
Schola Cantorum de Paris alumni
1958 births